An Afternoon with SCTV is an upcoming Canadian-American comedy streaming television special directed by Martin Scorsese. The special reunites the cast of Second City Television. The special was set to premiere on Netflix and CTV, but has been reportedly delayed due to the director's other commitments.

Production

Development
On April 12, 2018, Netflix announced that Martin Scorsese would direct a then-untitled television special reuniting the cast of Second City Television including Joe Flaherty, Eugene Levy, Andrea Martin, Catherine O'Hara, Martin Short, and Dave Thomas. Jimmy Kimmel was set as the special's moderator. Producers of the special were expected to include Andrew Alexander, Emma Tillinger Koskoff, and Lindsay Cox.

On May 10, 2018, it was reported CTV would co-produce the special and premiere it in Canada. Additionally, it was confirmed that Rick Moranis would take part in the reunion with his fellow cast members.

Filming
The special was filmed at the Elgin Theatre in Toronto, Ontario, Canada on May 13, 2018. The filming reportedly lasted around three hours and played to a live audience of around 1,500 people.

Release
The special was scheduled to be released on Netflix and CTV. On May 12, 2021, Joe Flaherty revealed in a Facebook comment on a SCTV fan group that the special had been shelved. However, the following day, on May 13, Netflix revealed the special had not been shelved, but delayed due to director Martin Scorsese's other commitments.

References

External links
 

2010s American television specials
Television series reunion specials
English-language television shows
Second City Television
Films directed by Martin Scorsese